Sekthaus Carl Graeger KG (literally Carl Graeger Sparkling Wine House) is a sparkling wine producer. It was established in 1877. Since 1997 it is headquartered in Bingen am Rhein.

The winery was established in Hochheim am Main in 1877 by Carl Graeger (1849-1902) as an offspring of the Graeger family wine business. At the break of the 20th century it was one of the finest German sparkling wine brands, earning multiple wine exhibition awards. After World War I the business suffered significantly due to post-war confiscations and competition from Great Britain and the United States. The last Graeger family owner of the business was Emma Graeger (died on April 17, 1970). In 1993 the company ceased their own wine production and Graeger brands have been produced by other wineries.

Carl Graeger held a number of patents, including those for a bottle washing machine, a hoist for transporting of wine bottles, and a method for the conservation of grape must: raw filtered grape must with added carbonic acid under the pressure of 5 atmospheres.

References

External links

Sparkling wines
German winemakers
1877 establishments in Germany
Companies based in Hesse